This list of 2023 in paleoentomology records new  fossil insect taxa that are to be described during the year, as well as documents significant paleoentomology discoveries and events which occurred during that year.

Clade Amphiesmenoptera

Lepidopterans

Trichopterans

Clade Antliophora

Dipterans

Brachycerans

Nematocerans

Dipteran research
 New fossil material of stratiomyomorphan larvae from the Cretaceous Myanmar amber is reported by Amaral et al. (2023), who interpret the studied fossils as indicating that members of Stratiomyomorpha were not rare, but in fact were common in the Myanmar amber.

Mecopterans

Clade Archaeorthoptera

Orthopterans

Other panorthopterans

Clade Coleopterida

Coleopterans

Myxophaga

Polyphaga

Cucujiformia

Elateriformia

Scarabaeiformia

Staphyliniformia

Clade Dictyoptera

Hymenopterans

"Symphyta"

Apocrita

Evanioidea

Formicoidea

Formicoidea research
Archibald, Mathewes, & Aase (2023) document two additional fossils of Titanomyrma species ant queens from the Green River Formation and a single queen from the Eocene Okanagan Highlands Allenby Formation.  They discuss the implications of the range extension for Formiciinae into the Ypresian temperate uplands, previously considered a thermophilic ant group, and the complication arising from preservational distortion during diagenesis.

Ichneumonoidea

Pompiloidea

Vespoidea

Clade Neuropterida

Neuropterans

Neuropteran research
 New fossil material of long-nosed antlion larvae, mostly from the Cretaceous Myanmar amber (and two specimens from the Eocene Baltic amber), is described by Hassenbach et al. (2023), who interpret the studied fossils as confirming that the morphological diversity of Cretaceous silky lacewings was much higher than the diversity of their extant relatives.

Raphidiopterans

Clade †Palaeodictyopteroidea

†Megasecoptera

Clade Palaeoptera

Ephemeropterans

Odonatopterans

Clade †Paoliidea

†Paoliida

Clade Paraneoptera

Hemipterans

Auchenorrhyncha

Heteroptera

Clade Perlidea

Embiopterans

Other insects
 Khramov, Foraponova & Węgierek (2023) describe specimens of Tillyardembia from the Permian locality Chekarda (Perm Krai, Russia) preserved with pollen on their heads, thoraces, legs and abdomens, representing the oldest record of pollen-bearing insects reported to date.

General research
 Solórzano‑Kraemer et al. (2023) report the preservation of phorid flies (but not fly larvae) associated with the holotype of Oculudentavis naga from the Cretaceous Myanmar amber, and interpret this finding as preserving early stage of scavenging by flies; the authors also note that there is not evidence of scavenging by ants from the Myanmar amber, and interpret it as suggesting that the Cretaceous ants did not yet have a foraging strategy to search for vertebrate corpses and to eat carrion.
 A diverse insect assemblage, including representatives of the orders Coleoptera, Diptera, Hymenoptera, Orthoptera and Hemiptera, is described from the Miocene shales from Wang Kaew in the Mae Sot basin (Thailand) by Warapeang et al. (2023).

References 

2023 in paleontology
Paleoentomology